"Privacy" is a song by American singer Chris Brown from his eighth studio album, Heartbreak on a Full Moon. After being previewed at the beginning of 2017, it was released by RCA Records as the third single from the album on March 24, 2017. The song is an R&B slow jam fully written by Brown, and produced by David Doman and Jim Stewart, where Brown both sings and raps. The lyrics of the song were described as "an explicit portrait of a wild sex night".

"Privacy" achieved commercial success in English-speaking countries, being certified double platinum by the Recording Industry Association of America (RIAA), Platinum by Australian Recording Industry Association (ARIA), and gold by the British Phonographic Industry (BPI).

Its music video was shot in Los Angeles on March 27, 2017, and released on April 14, 2017. The videoclip was praised by critics, that described it as "neon-colored", "dance-filled", "dreamy" and "creatively libidinous".

Background and recording
The song was made at Platinum Sound Recording Studios, in New York City the night of New Year's Eve 2016, minutes before the dropping of the ball. Brown said that there were lots of people celebrating in his studio while he was in the booth that night, and he was looking at the women through the booth's window, thinking about how he could've been with many of them in intimate situations, but he couldn't because the girls needed to have their privacy, and that thought sparked him the inspiration for the song. According to the song's recording engineer, Patrizio Pigliapoco, the making of the song took less than half an hour, and after that everyone from their team kept telling him that the song was phenomenal, Brown chose it to be his next single.

On January 4, 2017, Brown previewed two snippets on his Instagram profile from the songs "Privacy" and "Tell Me What to Do", that were unreleased songs planned to be on his upcoming eighth studio album, Heartbreak on a Full Moon. On January 10, 2017, Brown posted a video of himself and rapper Casanova dancing to "Privacy" in his recording studio. It was later announced in February that "Privacy" would've been released as the next single from Heartbreak on a Full Moon. The single was released on March 24, 2017, after being premiered on SoundCloud on the same day.

Composition
"Privacy" is an R&B slow jam fully written by Brown, and produced by David Doman, with additional production done by keyboard player Jim Stewart. In the song Brown sings the first two verses and the chorus, rapping on the third verse. The lyrics talk about how Brown can't wait to be alone with his lady in the bedroom, and about spending the night with her in a sexually explicit way. The song contains an interpolation of the 1990s dancehall song "Tight Up Skirt" by Red Rat in the first part of the chorus.

Music video
On March 24, 2017, Brown uploaded the audio for "Privacy" on his YouTube and Vevo account. The music video for the song was directed by Brown and shot in Los Angeles on March 27, 2017. The music video was released on April 14, 2017 on Vevo.

Synopsis
The neon-colored, dance-filled music video starts off in a Casino where Brown is walking and performing stylized dance moves on the tables, then entering an elevator, a lady catches his eye. Once following her into a room, he is transported on the stage with other superpower like dancers. At the end Brown is transported back to that hotel elevator. This time, he walks out with the girl he had been searching for, holding hands, and looking at the camera with a knowing smile.

Live performances 
Chris Brown performed the track during 2017 Bet Awards, and also during a charity concert organized by Tidal, and during a free pop-up concert in New York City some days before the dropping of his album Heartbreak on a Full Moon.

The song was included on the setlists of all Brown's tours after its dropping, including The Party Tour, Heartbreak On A Full Moon Tour, and Indigoat Tour.

Track listing
Digital download
"Privacy" – 3:40

Credits and personnel
Credits adapted from Tidal.

Chris Brown – vocals, composer
d.a. doman – producer, composer
Patrizio Pigliapoco – recording engineer

Jim Stewart – composer
Tom Coyne – mastering engineer
Jaycen Joshua – mixing engineer

Charts

Weekly charts

Year-end charts

Certifications

References

2017 singles
2017 songs
Chris Brown songs
RCA Records singles
Songs written by Chris Brown
Songs written by D.A. Got That Dope